Dasuha (Urdu: دسوہا) is a  small town near Faisalabad District in the state of Punjab, Pakistan, approximately 13 km from the city of Faisalabad on the Samundri road.

References

Villages in Faisalabad District